Rio Andres Gomez (born October 20, 1994) is an American professional baseball pitcher for the Boston Red Sox organization.

Gomez is the oldest son of Sandi and Pedro Gomez, a baseball journalist. He graduated from Desert Vista High School in Phoenix, Arizona. He was cut from the varsity baseball team in his senior year. Gomez attended Mesa Community College and walked on to the school's college baseball team. He then transferred to the University of Arizona and played for the Arizona Wildcats baseball team as a walk-on.

The Boston Red Sox selected him in the 36th round of the 2017 MLB draft. In 2018, he pitched for the Lowell Spinners.

Gomez played for the Colombian national baseball team, representing his mother's home country, in the 2023 World Baseball Classic. He pitched  innings of scoreless relief against the Canadian national team.

References

External links

Living people
1994 births
Sportspeople from Miami
Sportspeople from Phoenix, Arizona
Baseball pitchers
Mesa Thunderbirds baseball players
Arizona Wildcats baseball players
Gulf Coast Red Sox players
Lowell Spinners players
Greenville Drive players
Salem Red Sox players
Portland Sea Dogs players
2023 World Baseball Classic players